Brachycoleus  is a genus of plant-feeding insects of the family Miridae.

Species
Species within this genus include:
Brachycoleus bolivari Horvath, 1901
Brachycoleus decolor Reuter, 1887
Brachycoleus lineellus Jakovlev, 1884
Brachycoleus pilicornis (Panzer, 1805)
Brachycoleus sexvittatus Reuter, 1877
Brachycoleus steini Reuter, 1877
Brachycoleus triangularis (Goeze, 1778)

Description

Species within this  genus  are quite large  and  broad. Males usually are slender than the females. Head is wide and short. Bodies are covered with erect and semierect yellowish fine hairs. Basic color may be mainly red, orange and yellow, with black markings.

References

Miridae genera
Mirini